The Ontario minister’s zoning orders controversy refers to an ongoing controversy of the government of Ontario's use of minister’s zoning orders (MZOs), which allows it to override municipal council decisions on development. Both the frequency of their use and the way in which the government has used them has come under criticism.

Minister’s Zoning Orders  
Under the Planning Act, the Minister of Municipal Affairs and Housing has the authority to issue a minister’s zoning order (MZO) over any property in the province, determining the development plan for that property even if it overrules a municipal zoning bylaw. There is no process for appealing an MZO. The use of MZOs has traditionally been reserved mostly for emergency situations, such as after the collapse of the Algo Centre Mall, which killed two people.

After winning a majority in the 2018 Ontario general election, the Progressive Conservative Party of Ontario formed a new government in the province, led by Premier Doug Ford. The government then began using MZOs at a significantly increased rate compared to previous governments. Between 2019 and early 2021, Ford's government issued well over 30 MZOs, approaching the total of 49 MZOs that had been issued in the province between the 1969 and 2000, a period of three decades.

In October 2020, the government issued a set of MZOs aimed at the West Don Lands in Toronto, allowing for towers up to 50 storeys tall to be built without the city's approval. Several Toronto city councillors voiced their disapproval of the orders, with mayor John Tory stating that "I think that is a less than ideal situation, to say the least." In January 2021, a number of community groups protested against the attempted demolition of heritage-listed buildings at the Dominion Foundry Site. Court action forced province to pause demolition until legal issues could be resolved.  

In December 2020, the government passed Bill 229, the Protect, Support and Recover from COVID-19 Act (Budget Measures), 2020. The bill contained a number of changes to development regulations in the province, notably eliminating the ability of conservation authorities to veto MZOs.

In early March 2021, the government issued a further six MZOs, of which half overrided environmental limits on development proposals from Flato Developments. While announcing the MZOs, Ford defended his government's use of the orders, stating that "we will never stop issuing MZOs for the people of Ontario." Later that month, the government issued another order for a plot on the west side of Beeton, allowing Flato Developments to build a 995 units on the site, despite the site being located on a flood plain managed by the Nottawasaga Conservation Authority.

In April 2021, the government passed Bill 257, the Supporting Broadband and Infrastructure Expansion Act, 2021. Schedule 3 of the Act implemented further amendments to the Planning Act allowing it to issue MZOs that clash with the provincial government's development master plans. The bill further applied to all previously issued MZOs retroactively.

Reactions  
The government has defended its use of the orders, arguing that they are necessary to help create jobs and affordable housing, especially in the midst of the COVID-19 pandemic in Ontario. The government has also stated that it only issues them in accordance with the wishes of the local municipalities.

The government's use of MZOs has been described as part of a strongman approach to governance by Ford, preferring to force through policies without consideration of the destabilising effects it could have. Some commentators have described the government's use of MZOs as undemocratic and have accused the government of trying to evade accountability. The Ontario Federation of Agriculture stated that the "frequent use [of the orders] undermines Ontario’s long-established system of land use planning."

The government has been accused of corruption over its use of MZOs, particularly by favouring developers close to the Progressive Conservative Party. In December 2020, the Ontario NDP released evidence suggesting that around half of the MZOs issued by the government since March 2020 predominately benefited developers that had links to the Progressive Conservative Party.

Other commentators have criticised the environmental impact the government's use of MZOs would have, such as the plan to pave over parts of the Lower Duffins Creek wetland in Pickering and the plan for greenbelt development. Environmental Defence Canada has campaigned against the use of the orders, stating that "in addition to creating long term damage to the environment, increasing property taxes, and enabling more sprawl to eat up Ontario’s best farmland, the Minister has sent a strong message to the Ontario public that their opinion isn’t valuable, that experts don’t matter and that decisions enabling development are his alone."

The government had previously also passed a bill that stripped a number of powers from local conservation authorities. The government's approach has been described as harming local conservation authorities, with Conservation Ontario general manager Kim Gavine stating that they were now "basically the only landowners in Ontario who cannot appeal most planning decisions which affect their lands." In December 2020, seven members of the Ontario Greenbelt Council resigned in protest over the government's approach to development.

See also 
 Premiership of Doug Ford
 Zoning

References 

Politics of Ontario
Zoning